Loggerheads is an animated cartoon television series by Magma Films. It combines an old viking storylines with dark humour. It aired for only one season and was shown in Germany in 1997, on Britain's Channel Five in 1998 and later on the Pop TV channel, and in Italy TMC2 in 1999. It was also localized in Spain as Villabroncas and Portugal as O Mundo dos Vikings.

The Story revolves around the Loggerhead chief Bjorn the Red and the rich Gissur the Pale and his family's attempts to contest the post.

The opening/ending theme of the Italian version was written by Vito Abbonato and Andrea Ridolfi.

Episodes 
Viking Olympics
Give and Take
A Song for Europe
Rolvo's Big Adventure
Skeggi and the Fountain of Youth
The Taxman Cometh
Pirates
Queen Irmgard
Alfred the Admirable
Law and Disorder
Preacher Man
Sealed with a Kiss
Whale's Tale
Reversal of Fortune
Dragon
Love thy Neighbour
Five Vikings and a Baby
Viking Vows
Club Loggerheads
The Cowgirl
Leif the Unlucky
Rolvo's Pressing Engagement

References

External links
 

Television series set in the Middle Ages
1990s German animated television series
1997 German television series debuts
1997 German television series endings
1990s animated television series
German children's animated adventure television series
ProSieben original programming
Television series set in the Viking Age